Chorges (Vivaro-Alpine: Chorge) is a commune in the Hautes-Alpes department in southeastern France.

It is close to Gap. The name Chorges derives from Latin Catorimagus, itself coming from the Alpine tribe of the Caturiges in the ancient Roman province of Alpes Maritimae.

Location

Population

See also
Communes of the Hautes-Alpes department

References

External links

Official website in French

Communes of Hautes-Alpes
Caturiges